Buried Treasure is an American appraisal reality television program that debuted on the Fox network on August 24, 2011. The show is hosted by two professional appraisers, Leigh and Leslie Keno of Antiques Roadshow notability, who travel to people's houses in search of valuable items to appraise and sell for their owners. The show often features home owners who are in need of money, due to illness or other financial difficulties, that would evoke emotion in the audience. The premiere of the show attracted only 3.6 million viewers, while a competing show, Pawn Stars, typically receives twice as many viewers each week. It was not renewed for a second season.

Episode

References

External links

Fox Broadcasting Company original programming
2010s American reality television series
2011 American television series debuts
2011 American television series endings
Antiques television series
Television series by ITV Studios